Tegkwitz is a former municipality in the district Altenburger Land, in Thuringia, Germany. It was incorporated into  Starkenberg on 1 December 2008.

Geography of Thuringia
Duchy of Saxe-Altenburg